Polres Lembata Field is football field which is located in Lewoleba, Nubatukan, Lembata Regency, East Nusa Tenggara, Indonesia. This field is one of the two venues for the 2022 Liga 3 East Nusa Tenggara event.

References

Multi-purpose stadiums in Indonesia
Buildings and structures in East Nusa Tenggara
Football venues in Indonesia
Sports venues in Indonesia
Lembata Regency